Castleford Tigers are a professional rugby league club in Castleford, West Yorkshire, England, that compete in the Super League, the top-level professional rugby league club competition in the Northern Hemisphere. The club have competed in the top division for the majority of their existence, having only been relegated twice in their history.

They have won the Challenge Cup four times. Their most recent major trophy was the 1986 Challenge Cup.
Castleford have a rivalry with neighbours Featherstone Rovers and Wakefield Trinity. The club has been based at Wheldon Road since 1927, after moving from the Sandy Desert in Lock Lane. The club's current home colours are black and amber.

History

1896–1906: First Castleford club 

Castleford RFC joined the Northern Rugby Football Union for the 1896–97 season, its second and remained in the ranks of the semi-professionals until the end of the 1905–06 season. Not much is known about the original Castleford club, except that they have no connection with the present Castleford Tigers RLFC.

1926–1950s: Establishment of second club 
Castleford joined the league for the 1926–27 season. Many official records state that they were founded at this time but they had played successfully in the lower Yorkshire County Cup for several years before this date. They actually joined the League "code" around 1920 and played in these early years at the Sandy Desert ground, which is now used by amateur club Castleford Lock Lane youth and junior teams. The club went professional in 1926 and moved to their current home ground on Wheldon Road in 1927.

The club soon started to make a mark on northern rugby, winning their first major trophy when they topped the Yorkshire League in 1932, followed by victory in the Challenge Cup in 1935. In 1938, they made it to the Championship finals, but failed to take the cup. The Second World War meant the league was suspended soon after, and Castleford officially abstained from league competition until the 1944–45 season.

1960–1972: Success 
Castleford finished fourth in the national league in the 1962/63 season. The following season they lost 7–5 to Widnes in the Challenge Cup semi-final replay at Belle Vue, Wakefield in front of a 28,700 crowd after drawing at Station Road, Swinton in the first meeting of the two clubs. Under the direction of coach George Clinton, Castleford won many fans in the '60s by playing an open and free-flowing style of rugby, earning them the nicknames "Classy Cas" and "High Speed Cas", the latter playing off the slogan for British Gas in use at the time.

Castleford picked up where they left off when they were again beaten in the Championship finals in 1969, this time conceding defeat to arch-rivals Leeds. However, this loss seemed to spur the team on, and 1969 (v. Salford) and 1970 (v. Wigan) saw Castleford win the Challenge Cup for two consecutive years, with clubs legends Alan Hardisty and Keith Hepworth leading the team.

1973–1995: Consistency 
John Sheridan was appointed head coach in 1973 for a spell. Castleford's finished a respectable ninth in a one-division table but Sheridan stepped down following criticism from fans. During the late 1970s Castleford edged up the league, and in 1985 they made it to the Premiership final, where they were beat by Hull Kingston Rovers. A Yorkshire Cup defeat by at the beginning of the following season to Hull Kingston Rovers was bettered with a 15–14 triumph at Wembley again with Hull Kingston Rovers being the opponents . They finished consistently high over the next few years, and finished in the top four clubs in the Championship for four years during 1990–1995.

Darryl van der Velde took Castleford to the Challenge Cup final at Wembley in 1992 where they were defeated by Wigan. A year later, Darryl van der Velde left to become chief executive of the South Queensland Crushers, he was succeeded by his assistant John Joyner.

Through the Darryl van der Velde and early Joyner years Castleford were lauded for their style and were labelled 'Classy Cas'. This enjoyable playing style was to come to fruition most spectacularly in 1994, when Castleford were dominating the league. As well as defeating a legendary Wigan team to take the Regal Trophy 33–2, they were also semi-finalists in the Challenge Cup and were also narrowly defeated in the Premiership final. That season John Joyner, was named Coach-of-the-Year by the RFL. St John Ellis scored a then club record 40 league tries over the 1993–94 season.

1996–2004: Super League era 
When a Super League was suggested, Castleford resisted a merger with Wakefield Trinity and Featherstone Rovers, and became a founder member of the Super League in 1996. The team performed weakly at the start of the season causing the resignation of coach John Joyner, the team avoided relegation by a whisker in 1997 following the appointment of Stuart Raper.

The next season, they managed to frustrate the bleak predictions of pundits to move up the league, finishing sixth at the end of the season, after putting in some good performances and pleasing their fans with a sprinkling of victories.

In 1999, they continued on this upward trajectory, finishing fifth, as well as making the semi-finals of both the Challenge Cup and the Grand Final play-offs. This became one of the most famous seasons in the clubs recent past, with fans still remembering it with reverence. The team included many home grown players such as current assistant Danny Orr, and included that years Man of Steel winner Adrian Vowles. In 2000, the rise seemed to stall, as they repeated their fifth-place ranking and made the play-offs for a consecutive season. Raper left Castleford midway through the 2001 campaign to take charge of Wigan, his assistant Graham Steadman took over the reins as head coach.

Castleford made the semi-final of the Challenge Cup in 2002, however the team was to fall down the table over the years to come. Gary Mercer guided Castleford to five wins in their last 10 games after replacing Graham Steadman in 2004 but it was too little to save them from the drop as Castleford were relegated for the first time in the club's history. From the introduction of two divisions for the 1973–74 Northern Rugby Football League season Castleford had spent 32 years in the top flight of British rugby league. Gary Mercer left the club following their relegation from Super League.

2005–2007: Life in the second tier of Rugby League 
Dave Woods was appointed head coach and Castleford finished second in the Co-Operative Championship in 2005 and were back in the Super League via play-offs following victory in the playoff final, as well as competing in the Northern Rail Cup final, where they lost to Hull Kingston Rovers.

Terry Matterson joined Castleford in November 2005 in replacement of Woods. Castleford were celebrated for playing a good brand of Rugby League however it was not good enough to stop them from contesting a relegation dog fight which was to culminate in a historic match at Wakefield Trinity's Belle Vue, dubbed 'The Battle of Belle Vue'. It was a fight to stay in the league, and when Castleford lost to Wakefield Trinity, it confirmed their relegation. Many Castleford fans do not accept this relegation and it became a grave point of contention with the governing body. Castleford were relegated from second bottom in front of the newly inducted French side, Catalans Dragons, who had been given immunity from relegation that season, and behind Wigan who had been found guilty of a breach of the salary cap rules.

In 2007, Castleford again made a quick return to Super League as they finished top of the Championship with only one loss all season and defeated Widnes 42 – 10 in the Co-Operative Championship play-off final. Castleford finished bottom of Super League in 2008, but were not relegated due to the newly in place franchise rules.

2009–2012: Re-establishment in Super League 
In 2009, Castleford saw a brief return to success by reaching the Grand Final play-offs for the first time since Super League VII and made the semi-final of the Challenge Cup in 2011 before being knocked out by Leeds in an 8–10 defeat after extra time.

Terry Matterson stepped down at the end of the 2010/11 season to take up a coaching role in Australia and was replaced by former St. Helens coach Ian Millward. Millward released by mutual consent on 9 April 2013 after a poor run of results with 1 win in 18 games and with the team at the bottom of the Super League table. Daryl Powell was appointed coach in May 2013 taking over from assistant coach Danny Orr, who had been in temporary charge of the club.

2013–2021: Daryl Powell era 
Under Daryl Powell and Danny Orr, the club has again started to see success on and off the field. The 2014 side were again lauded as Classy Cas for their fast-paced and exciting style, with home grown players such as club captain Michael Shenton, Daryl Clark, Adam Milner, Oliver Holmes, Craig Huby and Andy Lynch, who was returning to the club. The side reached the Challenge Cup final in August 2014, losing to local rivals Leeds 23–10, watched by a crowd of 77,914 at Wembley Stadium. The side would eventually finish 4th in Super League and qualify for the play-offs. They were beaten 41 – 0 by St. Helens in their first game and therefore granted a second chance at progressing with a home tie against Warrington. They were beaten 14 – 30 and therefore knocked out of the play-offs. On 29 September 2015, the club announced the death of chairman Jack Fulton. In 2017, the Tigers enjoyed a phenomenal 23 game regular season as they finished 10 points clear at the top of the table prior to the split having won 20 and losing just 3 of their games. They went into the Super 8's having already secured a top four playoff spot by the end of the Super 8's and winning the League Leaders' Shield in the process. In the semifinal against St Helens, Luke Gale—just days after undergoing an emergency appendectomy—kicked a drop-goal in extra time to send Cas to their first Grand Final with a 23–22 win. They were defeated by Leeds Rhinos 24–6 with a late consolation score coming in the last minute to spare Castleford being the first team to fail to score in a Grand Final. Gale was voted Steve Prescott Man of Steel, while Powell picked up the Coach of the Year award for the second time having previously won in 2014.

In 2017, Castleford finished top of the table for the first time in their 91-year history and won the league leaders shield.  On 7 October, Castleford played in their first grand final since 1969 against The Leeds Rhinos.  Castleford lost the match 24–6 after being the favourites to claim their first ever title but fell short on the day.

2018 saw Castleford finish the regular season in 3rd position after an injury-hit year including the loss of key man Luke Gale for several months with a fractured knee-cap. Meanwhile, the Tigers' women's team made the Women's Challenge Cup Final losing 20–14 to Leeds Rhinos.

Castleford finished the Super League XXIV season in 5th place on the table.  Castleford reached the second week of the 2019 Super League finals Play-Offs where they were defeated by eventual Grand Finalists Salford Red Devils 22–0 in the elimination semi-final.

In the 2020 Super League season, the club finished a disappointing ninth on the table, their lowest finish since 2013.  Despite Castleford's poor season, Paul McShane won the 2020 Man of Steel award.

On 5 June 2021, Castleford reached the 2021 Challenge Cup Final after defeating Warrington 35–20.
In the 2021 Challenge Cup Final, Castleford lead St Helens 12–6 at half time but lost the match 26–12 after Saints scored 20 unanswered points in the second half.
Castleford finished the 2021 Super League season in 7th place and missed out on the playoffs.
In the 2022 Super League season, Castleford started the year poorly before reaching the playoff places towards the back end of the season.  In the final match of the year, Castleford lost 14–6 against Leeds to finish 7th with Leeds taking their place in the playoffs.

Stadiums

1926–present: Wheldon Road 

Wheldon Road was built in 1926 originally to be the home of Castleford Town F.C. Castleford RLFC moved in for 1927 after playing their first season of rugby league across the river where Castleford Lock Lane now play their home games. Its record attendance was in 1935 when 25,449 fans watched Cas play Hunslet in the Challenge Cup third round. In 2015 it was announced that they would be leaving Wheldon Road and moving to a new stadium in Glasshoughton.

Axiom 
The Lateral Property group submitted a planning application for a proposed £135 million development and Five Towns Stadium in Glasshoughton. Outline planning permission was given to the development in 2015, with Reserved Matters applications to follow. In early 2018, Lateral Property Group announced that site had been renamed Axiom, working with partner Highgrove Plc, a scheme which would include food, a country park and an omni-retail experience. Numerous planning applications have been submitted through Wakefield MDC Planning Department to discharge conditions as well as amend the scheme slightly, with a Reserved Matters application for Phase 1 and 2a of the work approved. The timeplan provided by the developers is that work on supporting roads and groundworks will begin in Summer/Autumn 2018 with the stadium to be completed in time for the 2021 season. In July 2018, an application was submitted to increase the capacity of the proposed ground from 10,000 to 10,245.

Kit sponsors and manufacturers

Heritage players

2023 squad

2023 transfers

Gains

Losses

Staff directory

Board of directors

Elite performance

Youth development

Past coaches

Also see :Category:Castleford Tigers coaches

 William Rhodes 1926–28
 Jim Bacon 1928–29
 Dick Silcock 1929–30
 Billy Clements 1930–32
 William Rhodes 1932–51
 Jack Kitching 1951–52
 William Rhodes 1952–53
 Ernest Ward 1953–56
 Len Garbett 1956–57
 William Rhodes 1957–58
 Harry Street 1958–64
 George Clinton 1964–66
 Derek Turner 1966–69
 "Tommy" Smales 1969–70
 Alan Hardisty 1970–71
 Harry Poole 1971–72
 John Sheridan 1972–73
 Dave Cox 1973–1974
 Mal Reilly 1974–87
 David Sampson 1987–88
 Darryl van der Velde 1988–93
 John Joyner 1993–97
 Mick Morgan 1997 (Caretaker)
 Stuart Raper 1997–2001
 Graham Steadman 2001–04
 Gary Mercer 2004
 Dave Woods 2005
 Terry Matterson 2005–11
 Ian Millward 2012–13
 Danny Orr 2013 (Caretaker)
 Daryl Powell 2013–21
 Lee Radford 2022–present

Seasons

Honours

Leagues 
Division 1 / Super League:
Runners up (1): 2017
League Leaders' Shield:
Winners (1): 2017
Division 2 / Championship:
Winners (2): 2005, 2007
RFL Championship Leaders' Shield:
Winners (1): 2007
RFL Yorkshire League:
Winners (3): 1932–33, 1938–39, 1964–65

Cups 
Challenge Cup:
Winners (4): 1934–35, 1968–69, 1969–70, 1985–86
Runners up (3): 1992, 2014, 2021
RFL Yorkshire Cup:
Winners (5): 1977–78, 1981–82, 1986–87, 1990–91, 1991–92
League Cup:
Winners (2): 1976–77, 1993–94
BBC2 Floodlit Trophy:
Winners (4): 1965–66, 1966–67, 1967–68, 1976–77

Records 
Biggest win:-
Rochdale Hornets 0–106 Castleford Tigers 13 September 2007
Heaviest defeat:
Castleford Tigers 4–72 St. Helens – 13 August 2006
Highest attendance:-
11,702 – 7 March Castleford Tigers vs Leeds

All club records 
Player records
Most tries in a game:-
5 by John Joyner (vs Millom) 16 September 1973
5 by Derek Foster (vs Hunslet) November 1972
5 by Steve Fenton (vs Dewsbury) 27 January 1978
5 by Ian French (vs Hunslet) 9 February 1986
5 by St. John Ellis (vs Whitehaven) 10 December 1989
5 by Greg Eden (vs Warrington Wolves) 11 June 2017

Most goals in a game:-
17 by Geoffrey "Geoff" 'Sammy' Lloyd (vs Millom) 16 September 1973

Most points in a game:-
43 by Sammy Lloyd (vs Millom) 16 September 1973

Most tries in a season:-
42 by Denny Solomona 2016

Most goals in a season:-
158 by Sammy Lloyd – 1976–77

Most points in a season:-
334 by Bob Beardmore, 1983–84

Career records
Most career tries:-
206 by Alan Hardisty 1958–71

Most career goals:-
875 by Albert Lunn 1951–63

Most career points:- 
1870 by Albert Lunn 1951–63

Club records
Castleford's biggest win:-
9 September 2007 – LHF National League 1
Rochdale Hornets 0 v 106 Castleford Tigers

Highest attendance (Wheldon Road):-
9 March 1935 – Castleford vs Hunslet – 25,449

Highest attendance (Challenge Cup):-
17 May 1969 – Castleford vs Salford – 97,939 (1969 Challenge Cup Final)

Highest attendance vs an international touring team:-
6 October 1948 – Castleford vs Australia – 14,004 (1948–49 Kangaroo Tour)

Most appearances 
Source:

Super League player records
Most tries in a game (Super League matches only):-
5 by Greg Eden (vs Warrington Wolves) 11 June 2017

Most goals in a game (Super League matches only):-
10 by Jamie Ellis (vs Huddersfield) 8 July 2012

Most points in a game (Super League matches only):-
24 by Kirk Dixon (vs Crusaders Rugby League) 27 March 2011 – (2 tries, 8 goals)
24 by Jamie Ellis vs Huddersfield 8 July 2012 – (1 try, 10 goals)
24 by Luke Gale (vs Leigh) 10 February 2017 – (2 tries, 8 goals)
24 by Luke Gale (vs Huddersfield) 31 March 2017 – (3 tries, 6 goals)

Most tries in a season (Super League matches only):- 
40 by Denny Solomona 2016

Most goals in a season (Super League matches only):- 
118 by Luke Gale 2016

Most points in a season (Super League matches only):-
Luke Gale – 262 (2016)
Appearances – 29
Tries – 6
Goals – 118
Drop Goals – 2

Supporters 

Castleford have an average gate close to 8,000 per home game throughout the Super League era. In 2018 the club are currently averaging close to 10,000. The majority of Castleford's matchday support comes from primarily Castleford and the nearby towns of Normanton, Kippax, Knottingley, Pontefract, Rothwell, Garforth, York, Selby, Sherburn-in-Elmet and Cross Gates.

While the club spent the 2005 & 2007 rugby league season in the Co-Operative Championship due to relegation the club still had an average attendance of 5,000+ and broke most records in the Co-Operative Championship for attendance most notably against Hull Kingston Rovers in the Northern Rail Cup Final which was spectated by a crowd of 9,400 and the Co-Operative Championship record attendance of 20,814 in the 2007 grand final against Widnes.

Castleford's fanbase includes a host of celebrity supporters, including England international cricketers Chris Silverwood and Tim Bresnan, Coronation Street actor Alan Halsall, former Coronation Street actress Lucy-Jo Hudson and Notts County and former England footballer Alan Smith.

Notes

References

External links 

 

 
Rugby clubs established in 1926
Super League teams
1926 establishments in England
English rugby league teams